The Parkes Elvis Festival is an annual event celebrating the music and the legend of Elvis Presley held in early January in the Australian New South Wales regional town of Parkes. 
The first festival in 1993 was simply a one night performance attracting 300 attendees. From then, it has grown to become a five-day-long festival of all things Elvis. The Festival now offers more than 200 events for fans to shake, rattle and roll their way around and continues to attract more than 25,000 people to Parkes.

History

First event
The first Parkes Elvis Festival, held in 1992, was a one night event attracting 200 people. It was held at Graceland Restaurant to commemorate Elvis' birthday. Over the next few years more events were added and the festival was extended to two days with a few hundred people attending.

2005 
By January 2005, the attendance had increased to 3,500 people.

2006
In January 2006, there was a 40 per cent increase with 5,000 seeing the festival and it injected an estimated $8 million into the Parkes economy.

2007
The 2007 festival had over 60 events and was held over five days.  More than 6,000 visitors were estimated to have attended.  A new world record was set for the most Elvis impersonators in one location. SBS Independent commissioned a half-hour documentary on the festival, Elvis Lives in Parkes, which was first aired on Australian television on 10 January 2007.

2008
Featuring over 80 events, the 2008 Festival attracted in excess of 8,000 people.

2009
The 2009 Festival became the biggest yet with a huge crowd of 9,500 enjoying the Elvis festivities. The King's Castle - a collection of genuine Elvis memorabilia, was introduced in 2009 adding a new dimension to the Festival. The collection is now open year-round.

2010
The Festival attracted record crowds again with 12,000 people enjoying over 140 events across 5 days.

2011
The 2011 Festival attracted 15,000 people. There were over 150 events across the 5 days. The Kings Castle - a collection of genuine Elvis Memorabilia in Parkes moved to a new and improved complex allowing more visitors to see the collection.

2012
The 2012 festival started on 11 January 2012.  It features a guest appearance by Australian singer Kamahl.

2017
The 2017 Festival ran from 11 to 15 January. It was the 25th festival. The theme was Viva Las Vegas. The Elvis tribute artists for the four feature concerts held at the Parkes Leagues Club was Pete Storm and Jake Rowley.

2018
The 2018 Festival ran from 10 to 14 January. It was the 26th Festival celebrating 50 years since the "'68 Comeback" theme. More than 26,500 people enjoyed an array of events including International Elvis tribute artist Ben Thompson.

2019
On 23 January 2019 it was reported by Free Malaysia Today as well as the Parkes Champion Post that some AU$13 million (US$9.3 million) had impacted on the economy of Parkes, as more than 27,000 people visited it to attend some 200 Elvis themed events, with the New South Wales state government projecting an injection of AU$43 million ̈(US̩30.6 million) into the wider region surrounding Parkes in 2019 due to the festival huge success.

2022
With 2021's cancellation on grounds of COVID-19 pandemic, the festival's on hiatus through April 2022.  The Parkes Elvis Festival is in its 29th year and attracts close to 25,000 to the town some 222 miles west of Sydney.

Sponsors
Parkes Elvis Festival sponsors include Destination NSW, ARTC, Parkes Shire Council itself and Northparkes Mines, along with many more contributing partners and supporters.

References

External links
 Parkes Elvis Festival
 Visit NSW Guide to Parkes Elvis Festival
  hosted by NSW TrainLink
 Parkes Shire Council homepage

Music festivals in Australia
Music festivals established in 1993
Elvis Presley tribute festivals
Festivals in New South Wales
Parkes Shire
1993 establishments in Australia